The Whig Junto is the name given to a group of leading Whigs who were seen to direct the management of the Whig Party and often the government, during the reigns of William III and Anne. The Whig Junto proper consisted of John Somers, later Baron Somers; Charles Montagu, later Earl of Halifax; Thomas Wharton, later Marquess of Wharton, and Edward Russell, later Earl of Orford. They came to prominence due to the favour of Robert Spencer, 2nd Earl of Sunderland and during the reign of Queen Anne, Sunderland's son, the 3rd Earl succeeded his father. Opponents gave them the nickname "the five tyrannising lords". Other figures prominent around the edges of the Junto include Sir John Trenchard and Thomas Tollemache.

Somers, Wharton, Russell and Montagu were elected to the House of Commons in 1689 and were granted minor office. Their effectiveness in the Commons brought them Sunderland's attention. The Junto began to dominate the ministry from the time of the resignation of the Tory Secretary of State Lord Nottingham in 1693, communicating to the King and Sunderland through the Whig Secretary of State, the Duke of Shrewsbury. As the members of the Junto entered the Lords — Somers was made Lord Keeper in 1693 and was promoted to a barony four years later, Wharton succeeded his father as Baron Wharton in 1696, Russell was created Earl of Orford in 1697 and Montagu(e) was created Baron Halifax in 1700 — their hold on the Commons weakened and by 1700 the Junto was largely out of power. In 1701 Somers, Orford and Halifax were impeached but survived the attack and late in the year the Junto seemed set to return to power in order to help the king rally support for the War of the Spanish Succession.
However, King William's death in March 1702 delayed their return: Queen Anne detested them and refused to include them in the ministry, which was instead dominated by High Tories, with whom her sympathies lay. With the elder Sunderland dead, the Junto's connection to his son — who was the son-in-law of the Queen's favourite couple, the Duke and Duchess of Marlborough — proved useful, as did the Junto's support of the war, which contrasted with Tory ambivalence to it.

In 1705 Somers's protégé Lord Cowper, whom the Queen liked and trusted, was made Lord Keeper and in 1706 Sunderland became a Secretary of State, even though the Queen disliked him even more than she did the rest of the Junto. After the resignation of Harley in 1708, Marlborough and his ally the Lord Treasurer Godolphin became more and more dependent on the Junto, who returned to office with Somers as Lord President, Wharton as Lord Lieutenant of Ireland and Orford as First Lord of the Admiralty.

The ministry's increasing dependence on the Junto Whigs caused the Queen's relationship with the Marlboroughs and Godolphin to sour. In 1710 Godolphin and the Junto Whigs were forced from power. The Junto led opposition to the new ministry's peace policy from the House of Lords, leading to the creation of new peers to prevent this opposition from voting down the peace treaty.

In North America, the Whig Junto was the inspiration for Benjamin Franklin's Junto in 1727 Philadelphia upon his return from London.

The term "Junto" is derived from "Junta", a Hispano-Portuguese term for a civil deliberative or administrative council, which in 18th-century English had not yet gained its present association with the governments of a military dictatorship.

First (Main) Whig Junto

Later Whig Junto and the Whig Governments

The Junto came back to power within a year of the accession as King of George I, the Elector of Hanover, in 1714 but most of the members died early in the new reign: Wharton and Halifax in 1715, Somers the next year, while Orford and Sunderland soon fell out with each other, with Orford not holding office after 1717.

Whigs however took full control of the government in 1715, and despite a brief internal split remained totally dominant, reaching new heights with the creation of the first recognised Prime Minister, Robert Walpole. This was however until King George III, coming to the throne in 1760, ensured the creation of more peerages for Tories — they sought to dispel a naturally resultant economic favouritism based on politics, caused by this long renewed period of ascendancy and promised greater royal concessions.

Notes and references
Notes 
  
References

Sources
 
 
 
 
 

Whigs (British political party)
Stuart England